The Jiladpur Mosque is an ancient three-domed mosque in Moulvibazar District, Bangladesh. It is believed that the mosque was built in the late 1500s AD.

Location
The mosque is located in the village of Jiladpur (West Ashidron) in Ward 1 of Sreemangal Upazila's Ashidron Union Council. It sits on the banks of the Bilash River. The mosque is visited by people from all over the country by Muslims and non-Muslims alike.

Folklore
There is a folk tale associated with the construction of the mosque. Locals believe that one day, a group of villagers were present at the banks of the Bilash River and decided that they wanted to build a mosque. They started planning at once, and by the end of the day had a rough idea of how the mosque should be built. They went to sleep intending that construction should start the next day. When the villagers woke up the next day and went to the site, they saw a three-domed lime-brick mosque, and had no idea where and who it came from. Even today, the Jiladpur Mosque, is referred to as a "Ghayebi mosque" as they believe it was built by Muslim jinns in one night.

Architecture and structure
No rods or brick-and-cement was used to build this mosque which is peculiar to other mosques in region. The quantity of domes being three resembles Mughal architecture styles. It spans three acres and can fit up to 150 people at once. The mosque is regularly painted and refurbished, and the locals have established a separate toilet, wudukhana, and verandah.

References

Srimangal Upazila
16th-century mosques
Historic sites in Bangladesh
Mosques in Bangladesh
Mosque buildings with domes